Bulbaspis ("bulb shield") is a late Ordovician genus of asaphid trilobites of the family Raphiophoridae found primarily in upper Ordovician-aged deepwater marine strata of Kazakhstan, China, and possibly Tasmania.  Species of Bulbaspis are similar to other raphiophorids such as Ampyx and Raphiophorus, save that the long spine that emanates from the glabella of the latter two genera has been modified into a knob-like or bulb-like structure in Bulbaspis that developed incrementally in the animal's growth.  The function of the bulb is currently unknown: one hypothesis suggests sexual selection may have had a role in its evolution in the genus.

Species
 ovulum group
 B. lageniformis Zhou et al. 1982
 B. ovulum Weber 1948
 B. ordosensis Lu et al. 1976
 bulbifer group
 B. brevis Zhou & Zhou, 2006
 B. bulbifer (Weber, 1932)
 B. korlaensis Zhang, 1981
 B. mirabilis Chugaeva, 1958
 B. sphaerornatus Chugaeva, 1958

See also 
List of trilobites

References 

Raphiophoridae
Asaphida genera
Ordovician trilobites of Asia
Late Ordovician first appearances
Late Ordovician extinctions